Loughkeen (Baile Locha Caoin in Irish) is a townland and a civil parish in the barony of Ormond Lower, County Tipperary in Ireland. It is located south-west of Riverstown in the extreme north of the county.

See also
 List of civil parishes of County Tipperary

References

Townlands of County Tipperary
Civil parishes of Ormond Lower